Tears of a Clown is the fifth album by rapper Andre Nickatina. It was released on May 18, 1999, for Fillmoe Coleman Records and was produced by Andre Nickatina, Dion Peete, J Mack, Nick Peace and DJ Pause.

Track listing
"The Rap Gods" - 2:50  
"Tears of a Clown" - 3:07  
"Last Breath of an MC" - 3:35  
"My Rap World [Remix]" - 3:43  
"Everlasting Like Infinity" [Performed by Lolo Swift] - 3:49 
"Sun Duck Kim" - 3:08  
"R These Your Shoes" (Ft. Shag Nasty) - 3:36  
"The Rap Game's Revenge [BOSS]" - 1:42  
"Classified" - 5:04  
"Worldwide" [Performed by Lolo Swift] - 4:06  
"My Rap World" - 3:21  
"Scottie 15" (Ft. Shag Nasty) - 3:02  
"Even Pimps Get Broken Hearts [Filmoe Coleman Band Instrumental]" - 5:24  
"Close My Eyes" - 1:59

1999 albums
Andre Nickatina albums